The Electoral district of County of Stanley was an electorate of the New South Wales Legislative Council at a time when some of its members were elected and the balance were appointed by the Governor. It was a new electorate created in 1851 by the expansion of the Legislative Council to 54 members, with 18 to be appointed and 36 elected. 
The previous district of Counties of Gloucester, Macquarie, and Stanley was split into the districts of Gloucester & Macquarie, Stanley and Stanley Boroughs, which included North Brisbane, South Brisbane, Kangaroo Point and Ipswich.

In 1856 the unicameral Legislative Council was abolished and replaced with an elected Legislative Assembly and an appointed Legislative Council. The district was represented by the Legislative Assembly electorate of Electoral district of Stanley County.

Members

Election results

1851

1854 (1)
John Richardson resigned in March 1854.

As the votes were tied, the returning officer had a casting vote which he gave for Arthur Hodgson.

1854 (2)
Arthur Hodgson's election was declared void.

References

Former electoral districts of New South Wales Legislative Council
Electoral districts of New South Wales in the area of Queensland
1851 establishments in Australia
1856 disestablishments in Australia